Xinjiang is a town under the administration of Wengyuan County, Shaoguan, Guangdong, China. , the town administers one neighbourhood committee and 19 village committees, including Shangba, which in 2007 acquired the nickname of "China's Village of Death".

References 

Towns in Guangdong
Wengyuan County